Oghi is a tehsil in Mansehra District, in the Khyber Pakhtunkhwa province of Pakistan. Its territory largely coincides with the Agror Valley, and its headquarters is the town of Oghi.

There tehsils is made up of the following union councils: Oghi, Belian, Dilbori, Kathai, Karori, Shamdhara, Shergarh, and Shungli Bandi.
In August 2017, the three union councils of Darband, Nika Pani and Shanaya were separated into the new tehsil of Darband.

Population 
The major social groups are the Sawati, Syed (Jalali) Pathans and Gujjars. The predominant language is Pashto, spoken by about three quarters of the population, but there is a large group of Hindko speakers and a smaller number of speakers of Gojri. The main economics activities are agriculture, forestry and livestock production.

Most of the area is arid or rain-fed. About 25% of the people are involved in the agricultural sector. Timber is the main source of fuel.

Tanawal Area 
On the southwestern side is the Tanawal valley. New Darband Township and Shergarh are the main town and village of the Tehsil, respectively. Tanolis are the main caste of this area.

References

External links

Mansehra District
Tehsils of Khyber Pakhtunkhwa